The Ōmori Shell Mounds are the middens, located in Ōmori, on the border of Shinagawa and Ōta, Tokyo, Japan.

Overview
The shell mounds had been known to the local people for a long time. In 1877, the American zoologist Edward S. Morse (who would later teach zoology at the University of Tokyo) came to Japan, and,  on the second day of his arrival while riding Japan's first railway from Yokohama to Tokyo (founded in 1872), "found" these mounds and instantly felt their importance.

Dr. Morse with his assistants later excavated these mounds from the Jōmon Period and published his paper in 1879, which launched Japan's modern archeology.

These shell mounds are now part of Ōmori Shell Mounds Garden, open to the public. In 1955, the sites were registered as Japan's Historic Sites. The shells, pottery, and other items that Dr. Morse excavated are mostly stored at the University Museum of the University of Tokyo and are Japan's Important Cultural Property.

Transportation
The Ōmori Shell Mounds are located within five-minutes' walk from the north entrance of Ōmori Railway Station of the JR Keihin–Tōhoku Line.

See also 
Jōmon period

References

External links

The Omori Shellmounds (Shinagawa Historical Museum)

Shell middens in Japan
Shinagawa
Tourist attractions in Tokyo